"In Love Again" is a song by Australian electronic rock group Rogue Traders. It was sent to radio in August 2006 as the fifth and final single in August 2006 from their second album Here Come the Drums. The coda of the song features a sample of "Head Over Heels" by Tears for Fears.

In mid-2007, it was used as a promotional song for Australian drama, Neighbours.

At the APRA Awards of 2008, the song won Dance Work of the Year.

Music video
The video for this song was filmed during the band's tour schedule and has snippets of previous performances. According to James Ash on the official forum, the original video clip was to be an all brown clip based on a wedding full of ghosts of past lovers. They opted for the clip you see now, which was a way to finish what they had done with the album.

Track listing
Promotional CD
 "In Love Again" (radio edit) - 3:40

Charts
Radio singles were ineligible to chart on the official ARIA chart in 2006; however, it peaked at number 20 on the Australian Digital Tracks.

In Love Again 2021

In 2021, The Rogue Traders re-released the song as "In Love Again 2021".

Track listing
Digital single
 "In Love Again 2021" (James Ash & Marcus Knight Radio edit) - 2:51

Digital remixes single
 "In Love Again 2021" (James Ash & Marcus Knight Radio edit) - 2:51
 "In Love Again 2021" (Supermini Radio edit) - 3:57
 "In Love Again 2021" (James Ash & Marcus Knight extended) - 4:23
 "In Love Again 2021" (Supermini Radio extended) - 6:27
 "In Love Again 2021" (Andy Murphy remix) - 6:19

References

2006 singles
APRA Award winners
Rogue Traders songs
Songs written by Roland Orzabal